The history of slavery in the Muslim world began with institutions inherited from pre-Islamic Arabia. The practices of keeping slaves in the Muslim world nevertheless developed in radically different ways in different Muslim states based on a range of social-political factors, as well as the more immediate economic and logistical considerations of the Arab slave trade. As a general principle, Islam encouraged the manumission of Muslim slaves as a way of expiating sins, and many early converts to Islam, such as Bilal, were former slaves. However, slavery persisted as an institution in the Muslim world through to the modern era.

Throughout Muslim history, slaves served in various social and economic roles, from powerful emirs to harshly treated manual laborers. Slaves were widely employed in irrigation, mining, and animal husbandry, but most commonly as soldiers, guards, domestic workers, concubines (sex slaves). The use of slaves for hard physical labor early on in Muslim history led to several destructive slave revolts, the most notable being the Zanj Rebellion of 869–883, and led to the end of the practice. Many rulers also used slaves in the military and administration to such an extent that slaves could seize power, as did the Mamluks.

Most slaves were imported from outside the Muslim world. In theory, slavery in Islamic law does not have a racial basis, but this was not always the case in practice. The Arab slave trade was most active in West Asia, North Africa, and Southeast Africa, and rough estimates place the number of black Africans enslaved in the twelve centuries prior to the 20th century at between 11.5 million to 15 million.  The Ottoman slave trade came from raids into eastern and central Europe and the Caucasus, while slave traders from the Barbary Coast raided the Mediterranean coasts of Europe and as far afield as the British Isles and Iceland.

In the early 20th century, the authorities in Muslim states gradually outlawed and suppressed slavery, largely due to pressure exerted by Western nations such as Britain and France. Slavery in the Ottoman Empire was abolished in 1924 when the new Turkish Constitution disbanded the Imperial Harem and made the last concubines and eunuchs free citizens of the newly proclaimed republic. Slavery in Iran was abolished in 1929. In the Gulf, Saudi Arabia and Yemen abolished it in 1962, while Oman followed in 1970. Mauritania became the last state to abolish slavery, in 1981. In 1990 the Cairo Declaration on Human Rights in Islam declared that "no one has the right to enslave" another human being. As of 2001, however, instances of modern slavery persisted in areas of the Sahel, and several 21st-century terroristic jihadist groups have attempted to use historic slavery in the Muslim world as a pretext for reviving slavery in 21st-century.

Slavery in pre-Islamic Arabia
Slavery was widely practiced in pre-Islamic Arabia, as well as in the rest of the ancient and early medieval world. The minority were European and Caucasus slaves of foreign extraction, likely brought in by Arab caravaners (or the product of Bedouin captures) stretching back to biblical times. Native Arab slaves had also existed, a prime example being Zayd ibn Harithah, later to become Muhammad's adopted son. Arab slaves, however, usually obtained as captives, were generally ransomed off amongst nomad tribes. The slave population increased by the custom of child abandonment (see also infanticide), and by the kidnapping or sale of small children. Whether enslavement for debt or the sale of children by their families was common is disputed. (historian Henri Brunschvig argues it was rare, but according to Jonathan E. Brockopp, debt slavery was persistent.) Free persons could sell their offspring, or even themselves, into slavery. Enslavement was also possible as a consequence of committing certain offenses against the law, as in the Roman Empire.

Two classes of slave existed: a purchased slave, and a slave born in the master's home. Over the latter, the master had complete rights of ownership, though these slaves were unlikely to be sold or disposed of by the master. Female slaves were at times forced into prostitution for the benefit of their masters, in accordance with Near Eastern customs.

Slavery in Islamic Arabia

Early Islamic history
W. Montgomery Watt points out that Muhammad's expansion of Pax Islamica to the Arabian peninsula reduced warfare and raiding, and therefore cut off the basis for enslaving freemen. According to Patrick Manning, Islamic legislations against abuse of slaves limited the extent of enslavement in the Arabian peninsula and, to a lesser degree, for the area of the entire Umayyad Caliphate, where slavery had existed since the most ancient times.

According to Bernard Lewis, the growth of internal slave populations through natural increase was insufficient to maintain slave numbers through to modern times, which contrasts markedly with rapidly rising slave populations in the New World. He writes that

 Liberation by freemen of their own offspring born by slave mothers was "the primary drain". 
 Liberation of slaves as an act of piety, was a contributing factor. Other factors include:
 Castration: A fair proportion of male slaves were imported as eunuchs. Levy states that according to the Quran and Islamic traditions, such emasculation was objectionable. Some jurists such as [al-Baydawi considered castration to be mutilation, stipulating laws to prevent it. However, in practice, emasculation was frequent. In eighteenth-century Mecca, the majority of eunuchs were in the service of the mosques. Moreover, the process of castration (which included penectomy) carried a high risk of death.
 Liberation of military slaves: Military slaves that rose through the ranks were usually liberated at some stage in their careers.
 Restrictions on procreation: Among the menial, domestic, and manual worker slaves, casual sex was not permitted and marriage was not encouraged.
 High death toll: There was a high death toll among all classes of slaves. Slaves usually came from remote places and, lacking immunities, died in large numbers. Segal notes that the recently enslaved, weakened by their initial captivity and debilitating journey, would have been easy victims of an unfamiliar climate and infection. Children were especially at risk, and the Islamic market demand for children was much greater than the American one. Many black slaves lived in conditions conducive to malnutrition and disease, with effects on their own life expectancy, the fertility of women, and the infant mortality rate. As late as the 19th century, Western travellers in North Africa and Egypt noted the high death rate among imported black slaves.
 Another factor was the Zanj Rebellion against the plantation economy of ninth-century southern Iraq. Due to fears of a similar uprising among slave gangs occurring elsewhere, Muslims came to realize that large concentrations of slaves were not a suitable organization of labour and that slaves were best employed in smaller concentrations. As such, large-scale employment of slaves for manual labour became the exception rather than the norm, and the medieval Islamic world did not need to import vast numbers of slaves.

Arab slave trade

Bernard Lewis writes: "In one of the sad paradoxes of human history, it was the humanitarian reforms brought by Islam that resulted in a vast development of the slave trade inside, and still more outside, the Islamic empire." He notes that the Islamic injunctions against the enslavement of Muslims led to the massive importation of slaves from the outside. According to Patrick Manning, Islam by recognizing and codifying slavery seems to have done more to protect and expand slavery than the reverse.

The 'Arab' slave trade was part of the broader 'Islamic' slave trade. Bernard Lewis writes that "polytheists and idolaters were seen primarily as sources of slaves, to be imported into the Islamic world and molded-in Islamic ways, and, since they possessed no religion of their own worth the mention, as natural recruits for Islam." Patrick Manning states that religion was hardly the point of this slavery. Also, this term suggests comparison between Islamic slave trade and Christian slave trade. Propagators of Islam in Africa often revealed a cautious attitude towards proselytizing because of its effect in reducing the potential reservoir of slaves.

In the 8th century, Africa was dominated by Arab-Berbers in the north: Islam moved southwards along the Nile and along the desert trails. One supply of slaves was the Solomonic dynasty of Ethiopia which often exported Nilotic slaves from their western borderland provinces, or from newly conquered or reconquered Muslim provinces. Native Muslim Ethiopian sultanates exported slaves as well, such as the sometimes independent sultanate of Adal.

For a long time, until the early 18th century, the Crimean Khanate maintained a massive slave trade with the Ottoman Empire and the Middle East. Between 1530 and 1780 there were almost certainly 1 million and quite possibly as many as 1.25 million white, European Christians enslaved by the Muslims of the Barbary Coast of North Africa.

On the coast of the Indian Ocean too, slave-trading posts were set up by Muslim Arabs. The archipelago of Zanzibar, along the coast of present-day Tanzania, is undoubtedly the most notorious example of these trading colonies. Southeast Africa and the Indian Ocean continued as an important region for the Oriental slave trade up until the 19th century. Livingstone and Stanley were then the first Europeans to penetrate to the interior of the Congo basin and to discover the scale of slavery there. The Arab Tippu Tib extended his influence and made many people slaves. After Europeans had settled in the Gulf of Guinea, the trans-Saharan slave trade became less important. In Zanzibar, slavery was abolished late, in 1897, under Sultan Hamoud bin Mohammed. The rest of Africa had no direct contact with Muslim slave-traders.

Roles
While slaves were employed for manual labour during the Arab slave trade, although most agricultural labor in the medieval Islamic world consisted of paid labour. Exceptions include the plantation economy of southern Iraq (which led to the Zanj Revolt), in 9th-century Ifriqiya (modern-day Tunisia), and in 11th-century Bahrain (during the Karmatian state).

Roles of slaves
A system of plantation labor, much like that which would emerge in the Americas, developed early on, but with such dire consequences that subsequent engagements were relatively rare and reduced. Slaves in Islam were mainly directed at the service sector concubines and cooks, porters and soldiers with slavery itself primarily a form of consumption rather than a factor of production. The most telling evidence for this is found in the gender ratio; among slaves traded in Islamic empire across the centuries, there were roughly two females to every male.
Outside of explicit sexual slavery, most female slaves had domestic occupations. Often, this also included sexual relations with their masters – a lawful motive for their purchase and the most common one.

Military service was also a common role for slaves. Barbarians from the "martial races" beyond the frontiers were widely recruited into the imperial armies. These recruits often advanced in the imperial and eventually metropolitan forces, sometimes obtaining high ranks.

Arab views on African peoples 

Though the Qur'an expresses no racial prejudice against black Africans, Bernard Lewis argues that ethnocentric prejudice later developed among Arabs, for a variety of reasons: their extensive conquests and slave trade; the influence of Aristotelian ideas regarding slavery, which some Muslim philosophers directed towards Zanj (Bantu) and Turkic peoples; and the influence of religious ideas regarding divisions among humankind. By the 8th century, anti-black prejudice among Arabs resulted in discrimination. A number of medieval Arabic authors argued against this prejudice, urging respect for all black people and especially Ethiopians. By the 14th century, a significant number of slaves came from sub-Saharan Africa; Lewis argues that this led to the likes of Egyptian historian Al-Abshibi (1388–1446) writing that "[i]t is said that when the [black] slave is sated, he fornicates, when he is hungry, he steals."

Some authors argued that slavery in Islamic societies was relatively mild and free of racism until the late 20th century. However, recent research has uncovered evidence of racial thinking in Islamic history—especially anti-Black racism and a link between Blackness and slavery—dating back to at least the ninth century CE.

In 2010, at the Second Afro-Arab summit Libyan leader Muammar Gaddafi apologized for Arab involvement in the African slave trade, saying: "I regret the behavior of the Arabs... They brought African children to North Africa, they made them slaves, they sold them like animals, and they took them as slaves and traded them in a shameful way. I regret and I am ashamed when we remember these practices. I apologize for this."

Women and slavery

In Classical Arabic terminology, female slaves were generally called jawāri (s. jāriya ). Slave-girls specifically might be called imā’ (s. ama ), while female slaves who had been trained as entertainers or courtesans were usually called qiyān (IPA /qi'jaːn/; singular qayna, IPA /'qaina/).

Choosing elite slaves for the grooming process

Choosing slaves to undergo the grooming process was highly selective in the Moroccan empire. There are many attributes and skills slaves can possess to win the favour and trust of their masters. When examining master/slave relationships we are able to understand that slaves with white skin were especially valued in Islamic societies.  Mode of acquisition, as well as age when acquired heavily influenced slave value, as well as fostering trusting master-slave relationships. Many times, slaves acquired as adolescents or even young adults became trusted aides and confidants of their masters.  Furthermore, acquiring a slave during adolescence typically leads to opportunities for education and training, as slaves acquired in their adolescent years were at an ideal age to begin military training.  In Islamic societies, it was normal to begin this process at the age of ten, lasting until the age of fifteen, at which point these young men would be considered ready for military service.  Slaves with specialised skills were highly valued in Islamic slave societies.  Christian slaves were often required to speak and write in Arabic. Having slaves fluent in English and Arabic was a highly valued tool for diplomatic affairs. Bi-lingual slaves like Thomas Pellow used their translating ability for important matters of diplomacy.  Pellow himself worked as a translator for the ambassador in Morocco.

Rebellion
In some cases, slaves would join domestic rebellions or even rise up against governors. The most renowned of these rebellions was the Zanj Rebellion.

The Zanj Revolt took place near the city of Basra, located in southern Iraq, over a period of fifteen years (869–883 AD). It grew to involve over 500,000 slaves imported from across the Muslim empire, and claimed over “tens of thousands of lives in lower Iraq”. The revolt was said to have been led by Ali ibn Muhammad, who claimed to be a descendant of Caliph Ali ibn Abu Talib. Several historians, such as Al-Tabari and Al-Masudi, consider this revolt one of the “most vicious and brutal uprising[s]” out of the many disturbances that plagued the Abbasid central government.

Political power

Mamluks were slave-soldiers who were converted to Islam, and served the Muslim caliphs and the Ayyubid sultans during the Middle Ages. Over time, they became a powerful military caste, often defeating the Crusaders and, on more than one occasion, they seized power for themselves, for example, ruling Egypt in the Mamluk Sultanate from 1250 to 1517.

European slaves 
Saqaliba is a term used in medieval Arabic sources to refer to Slavs and other peoples of Central, Southern, and Eastern Europe, or in a broad sense to European slaves under Arab Islamic rule.

Through the Middle Ages up until the early modern period, a major source of slaves sent to Muslim lands was Central and Eastern Europe. Slaves of Northwestern Europe were also favored. The slaves captured were sent to Islamic lands like Spain and Egypt through France and Venice. Prague served as a major centre for castration of Slavic captives. The Emirate of Bari also served as an important port for trade of such slaves. After the Byzantine Empire and Venice blocked Arab merchants from European ports, Arabs started importing slaves from the Caucasus and Caspian Sea regions, shipping them off as far east as Transoxiana in Central Asia. Despite this, slaves taken in battle or from minor raids in continental Europe remained a steady resource in many regions. The Ottoman Empire used slaves from the Balkans and Eastern Europe. The Janissaries were primarily composed of enslaved Europeans. Slaving raids by Barbary Pirates on the coasts of Western Europe as far as Iceland remained a source of slaves until suppressed in the early 19th century. Common roles filled by European slaves ranged from laborers to concubines, and even soldiers.

Slavery in India
In the Muslim conquests of the 8th century, the armies of the Umayyad commander Muhammad bin Qasim enslaved tens of thousands of Indian prisoners, including both soldiers and civilians. In the early 11th century Tarikh al-Yamini, the Arab historian Al-Utbi recorded that in 1001 the armies of Mahmud of Ghazna conquered Peshawar and Waihand (capital of Gandhara) after the Battle of Peshawar in 1001, "in the midst of the land of Hindustan", and captured some 100,000 youths. Later, following his twelfth expedition into India in 1018–19, Mahmud is reported to have returned with such a large number of slaves that their value was reduced to only two to ten dirhams each. This unusually low price made, according to Al-Utbi, "merchants [come] from distant cities to purchase them, so that the countries of Central Asia, Iraq and Khurasan were swelled with them, and the fair and the dark, the rich and the poor, mingled in one common slavery". Elliot and Dowson refer to "five hundred thousand slaves, beautiful men, and women.". Later, during the Delhi Sultanate period (1206–1555), references to the abundant availability of low-priced Indian slaves abound. Levi attributes this primarily to the vast human resources of India, compared to its neighbors to the north and west (India's Mughal population being approximately 12 to 20 times that of Turan and Iran at the end of the 16th century).

The Delhi sultanate obtained thousands of slaves and eunuch servants from the villages of Eastern Bengal (a widespread practice which Mughal emperor Jahangir later tried to stop). Wars, famines and pestilences drove many villagers to sell their children as slaves. The Muslim conquest of Gujarat in Western India had two main objectives. The conquerors demanded and more often forcibly wrested both Hindu women as well as land owned by Hindus. Enslavement of women invariably led to their conversion to Islam. In battles waged by Muslims against Hindus in Malwa and the Deccan plateau, a large number of captives were taken. Muslim soldiers were permitted to retain and enslave prisoners of war as plunder.

The first Bahmani sultan, Alauddin Bahman Shah is noted to have captured 1,000 singing and dancing girls from Hindu temples after he battled the northern Carnatic chieftains. The later Bahmanis also enslaved civilian women and children in wars; many of them were converted to Islam in captivity.

During the rule of Shah Jahan, many peasants were compelled to sell their women and children into slavery to meet the land revenue demand.

Slavery in the Seljuk and Ottoman Empires

After the Seljuks conquered  parts of Asia Minor, they brought to the devastated lands Greek, Armenian and Syrian farmers after enslaving entire Byzantine and Armenian villages and towns.

Slavery was a legal and important part of the economy of the Ottoman Empire and Ottoman society until the slavery of Caucasians was banned in the early 19th century, although slaves from other groups were still permitted. In Constantinople (present-day Istanbul), the administrative and political center of the Empire, about a fifth of the population consisted of slaves in 1609. Even after several measures to ban slavery in the late 19th century, the practice continued largely uninterrupted into the early 20th century. As late as 1908, female slaves were still sold in the Ottoman Empire. Concubinage was a central part of the Ottoman slave system throughout the history of the institution.

A member of the Ottoman slave class, called a kul in Turkish, could achieve high status. Black castrated slaves, were tasked to guard the imperial harems, while white castrated slaves filled administrative functions. Janissaries were the elite soldiers of the imperial armies, collected in childhood as a "blood tax", while galley slaves captured in slave raids or as prisoners of war, manned the imperial vessels. Slaves were often to be found at the forefront of Ottoman politics. The majority of officials in the Ottoman government were bought slaves, raised free, and integral to the success of the Ottoman Empire from the 14th century into the 19th. Many officials themselves owned a large number of slaves, although the Sultan himself owned by far the largest number. By raising and specially training slaves as officials in palace schools such as Enderun, the Ottomans created administrators with intricate knowledge of government and a fanatic loyalty.

Ottomans practiced devşirme, a sort of "blood tax" or "child collection", young Christian boys from Eastern Europe and Anatolia were taken from their homes and families, brought up as Muslims, and enlisted into the most famous branch of the Kapıkulu, the Janissaries, a special soldier class of the Ottoman army that became a decisive faction in the Ottoman invasions of Europe. Most of the military commanders of the Ottoman forces, imperial administrators, and de facto rulers of the Empire, such as Pargalı Ibrahim Pasha and Sokollu Mehmed Pasha, were recruited in this way.

In the year 1341, The Turkish bey Umur of Aydin terrorized the Christians in the Aegean sea with his 350 ships and 15,000 men from a captured port in Smyrna, capturing many slaves.

Slavery in Sultanates of Southeast Asia

In the East Indies, slavery was common until the end of the 19th century. The slave trade was centered on the Muslim Sultanates in the Sulu Sea: the Sultanate of Sulu, the Sultanate of Maguindanao, and the Confederation of Sultanates in Lanao (the modern Moro people). Also the Aceh Sultanate on Sumatra took part in the slave trade. The economies of these sultanates relied heavily on the slave trade.
 

It is estimated that from 1770 to 1870, around 200,000 to 300,000 people were enslaved by Iranun and Banguingui slavers. These were taken by piracy from passing ships as well as coastal raids on settlements as far as the Malacca Strait, Java, the southern coast of China and the islands beyond the Makassar Strait. Most of the slaves were Tagalogs, Visayans, and "Malays" (including Bugis, Mandarese, Iban, and Makassar). There were also occasional European and Chinese captives who were usually ransomed off through Tausug intermediaries of the Sulu Sultanate.

The scale of this activity was so massive that the word for "pirate" in Malay became Lanun, an exonym of the Iranun people.  Male captives of the Iranun and the Banguingui were treated brutally, even fellow Muslim captives were not spared. They were usually forced to serve as galley slaves on the lanong and garay warships of their captors. Within a year of capture, most of the captives of the Iranun and Banguingui would be bartered off in Jolo usually for rice, opium, bolts of cloth, iron bars, brassware, and weapons. The buyers were usually Tausug datu from the Sultanate of Sulu who had preferential treatment, but buyers also included European (Dutch and Portuguese) and Chinese traders as well as Visayan pirates (renegados).

The economy of the Sulu sultanates was largely based on slaves and the slave trade. Slaves were the primary indicators of wealth and status, and they were the source of labor for the farms, fisheries, and workshops of the sultanates. While personal slaves were rarely sold, slave traders  trafficked extensively in slaves purchased from the Iranun and Banguingui slave markets. By the 1850s, slaves constituted 50% or more of the population of the Sulu archipelago.

Chattel slaves, known as banyaga, bisaya, ipun, or ammas were distinguished from the traditional debt bondsmen (the kiapangdilihan, known as alipin elsewhere in the Philippines). The bondsmen were natives enslaved to pay off debt or crime. They were slaves only in terms of their temporary service requirement to their master, but retained most of the rights of the freemen, including protection from physical harm and the fact that they could not be sold. The banyaga, on the other hand, had little to no rights.

Some slaves were treated like serfs and servants. Educated and skilled male slaves were largely treated well. Since most of the aristocratic classes in Sulu were illiterate, they were often dependent on the educated banyaga as scribes and interpreters. Slaves were often given their own houses and lived in small communities with slaves of similar ethnic and religious backgrounds. Harsh punishment and abuse were not uncommon, despite Islamic laws, especially for slave laborers and slaves who attempt to escape.  

Spanish authorities and native Christian Filipinos responded to the Moro slave raids by building watchtowers and forts across the Philippine archipelago, many of which are still standing today. Some provincial capitals were also moved further inland. Major command posts were built in Manila, Cavite, Cebu, Iloilo, Zamboanga, and Iligan. Defending ships were also built by local communities, especially in the Visayas Islands, including the construction of war "barangayanes" (balangay) that were faster than the Moro raiders' ships and could give chase. As resistance against raiders increased, Lanong warships of the Iranun were eventually replaced by the smaller and faster garay warships of the Banguingui in the early 19th century. The Moro raids were eventually subdued by several major naval expeditions by the Spanish and local forces from 1848 to 1891, including retaliatory bombardment and capture of Moro settlements. By this time, the Spanish had also acquired steam gunboats (vapor), which could easily overtake and destroy the native Moro warships.

The slave raids on merchant ships and coastal settlements disrupted traditional trade in goods in the Sulu Sea. While this was temporarily offset by the economic prosperity brought by the slave trade, the decline of slavery in the mid-19th century also led to the economic decline of the Sultanates of Brunei, Sulu, and Maguindanao. This eventually led to the collapse of the latter two states and contributed to the widespread poverty of the Moro region in the Philippines today. By the 1850s, most slaves were local-born from slave parents as the raiding became more difficult. By the end of the 19th century and the conquest of the Sultanates by the Spanish and the Americans, the slave population was largely integrated into the native population as citizens under the Philippine government.

The Sultanate of Gowa of the Bugis people also became involved in the Sulu slave trade. They purchased slaves (as well as opium and Bengali cloth) from the Sulu Sea sultanates, then re-sold the slaves in the slave markets in the rest of Southeast Asia. Several hundred slaves (mostly Christian Filipinos) were sold by the Bugis annually in Batavia, Malacca, Bantam, Cirebon, Banjarmasin, and Palembang by the Bugis. The slaves were usually sold to Dutch and Chinese families as servants, sailors, laborers, and concubines. The sale of Christian Filipinos (who were Spanish subjects) in Dutch-controlled cities led to formal protests by the Spanish Empire to the Netherlands and its prohibition in 1762 by the Dutch, but it had little effect due to lax or absent enforcement. The Bugis slave trade was only stopped in the 1860s, when the Spanish navy from Manila started patrolling Sulu waters to intercept Bugis slave ships and rescue Filipino captives. Also contributing to the decline was the hostility of the Sama-Bajau raiders in Tawi-Tawi who broke off their allegiance to the Sultanate of Sulu in the mid-1800s and started attacking ships trading with the Tausug ports.

Both non-Muslims and Muslims in Southeast Asia during the end of the 19th century bought Japanese girls as slaves who were imported to the region by sea. In Singapore as late as 1891, there was a regular trade in Chinese slaves by Muslim slaveowners, with girls and women sold for concubinage. However, the buying of Chinese girls in Singapore was forbidden for Muslims by a Batavia (Jakarta) based Arab Muslim Mufti, Usman bin Yahya in a fatwa because he ruled that in Islam it was illegal to buy free non-Muslims or marry non-Muslim slave girls during peace time from slave dealers and non-Muslims could only be enslaved and purchased during holy war (jihad).

A Chinese non-Muslim man had a female concubine who was of Muslim Arab Hadhrami Sayyid origin in Solo, the Dutch East Indies, in 1913 which was scandalous in the eyes of Ahmad Surkati and his Al-Irshad Al-Islamiya.

In Jeddah, Kingdom of Hejaz on the Arabian peninsula, the Arab king Ali bin Hussein, King of Hejaz had in his palace 20 young pretty Javanese girls from Java (modern day Indonesia).

19th and 20th centuries

The strong abolitionist movement in the 19th century in England and later in other Western countries influenced slavery in Muslim lands. Appalling loss of life and hardships often resulted from the processes of acquisition and transportation of slaves to Muslim lands and this drew the attention of European opponents of slavery. Continuing pressure from European countries eventually overcame the strong resistance of religious conservatives who were holding that forbidding what God permits is just as great an offense as to permit what God forbids. Slavery, in their eyes, was "authorized and regulated by the holy law". Even masters persuaded of their own piety and benevolence sexually exploited their concubines, without a thought of whether this constituted a violation of their humanity. There were also many pious Muslims who refused to have slaves and persuaded others not to do so. Eventually, the Ottoman Empire's orders against the traffic of slaves were issued and put into effect.

According to Brockopp, in the 19th century, "Some authorities made blanket pronouncements against slavery, arguing that it violated the Qurʾānic ideals of equality and freedom. The great slave markets of Cairo were closed down at the end of the nineteenth century and even conservative Qurʾān interpreters continue to regard slavery as opposed to Islamic principles of justice and equality."

Slavery in the forms of carpet weavers, sugarcane cutters, camel jockeys, sex slaves, and even chattel exists even today in some Muslim countries (though some have questioned the use of the term slavery as an accurate description).

According to a March 1886 article in The New York Times, the Ottoman Empire allowed a slave trade in girls to thrive during the late 1800s, while publicly denying it. Girl sexual slaves sold in the Ottoman Empire were mainly of three ethnic groups: Circassian, Syrian, and Nubian. Circassian girls were described by the American journalist as fair and light-skinned. They were frequently sent by Circassian leaders as gifts to the Ottomans. They were the most expensive, reaching up to 500 Turkish lira and the most popular with the Turks. The next most popular slaves were Syrian girls, with "dark eyes and hair", and light brown skin. Their price could reach to thirty lira. They were described by the American journalist as having "good figures when young". Throughout coastal regions in Anatolia, Syrian girls were sold. The New York Times journalist stated Nubian girls were the cheapest and least popular, fetching up to 20 lira.

Murray Gordon said that, unlike Western societies which developed anti-slavery movements, no such organizations developed in Muslim societies. In Muslim politics, the state interpreted Islamic law. This then extended legitimacy to the traffic in slaves.

Writing about the Arabia he visited in 1862, the English traveler W. G. Palgrave met large numbers of slaves. The effects of slave concubinage were apparent in the number of persons of mixed race and in the emancipation of slaves he found to be common. Charles Doughty, writing about 25 years later, made similar reports.

According to British explorer (and abolitionist) Samuel Baker, who visited Khartoum in 1862 six decades after the British had declared slave trade illegal, slave trade was the industry "that kept Khartoum going as a bustling town". From Khartoum slave raiders attacked African villages to the south, looting and destroying so that "surviving inhabitants would be forced to collaborate with slavers on their next excursion against neighboring villages," and taking back captured women and young adults to sell in slave markets.

In the 1800s, the slave trade from Africa to the Islamic countries picked up significantly when the European slave trade dropped around the 1850s only to be ended with European colonisation of Africa around 1900.

In 1814, Swiss explorer Johann Burckhardt wrote of his travels in Egypt and Nubia, where he saw the practice of slave trading: "I frequently witnessed scenes of the most shameless indecency, which the traders, who were the principal actors, only laughed at. I may venture to state, that very few female slaves who have passed their tenth year, reach Egypt or Arabia in a state of virginity."

Richard Francis Burton wrote about the Medina slaves, during his 1853 Haj, "a little black boy, perfect in all his points, and tolerably intelligent, costs about a thousand piastres; girls are dearer, and eunuchs fetch double that sum." In Zanzibar, Burton found slaves owning slaves.

David Livingstone wrote of the slave trade in the African Great Lakes region, which he visited in the mid-nineteenth century:
Zanzibar was once East Africa's main slave-trading port, and under Omani Arabs in the 19th century as many as 50,000 slaves were passing through the city each year.

Livingstone wrote in a letter to the editor of the New York Herald:

20th-century suppression and prohibition

At Istanbul, the sale of black and Circassian women was conducted openly, even well past the granting of the Constitution in 1908.

Throughout the 19th and 20th centuries, slavery gradually became outlawed and suppressed in Muslim lands, due to a combination of pressures exerted by Western nations such as Britain and France, internal pressure from Islamic abolitionist movements, and economic pressures.

By the Treaty of Jeddah, May 1927 (art.7), concluded between the British Government and Ibn Sa'ud (King of Nejd and the Hijaz) it was agreed to suppress the slave trade in Saudi Arabia.  Then by a decree issued in 1936, the importation of slaves into Saudi Arabia was prohibited unless it could be proved that they were slaves at the treaty date. In 1962, all slavery practices or trafficking in Saudi Arabia was prohibited.

By 1969, it could be observed that most Muslim states had abolished slavery, although it existed in the deserts of Iraq bordering Arabia and it still flourished in Saudi Arabia, Yemen and Oman. Slavery was not formally abolished in Yemen and Oman until the following year. The last nation to formally enact the abolition of slavery practice and slave trafficking was the Islamic Republic of Mauritania in 1981.

During the Second Sudanese Civil War (1983-2005) people were taken into slavery; estimates of abductions range from 14,000 to 200,000.

Slavery in Mauritania was legally abolished by laws passed in 1905, 1961, and 1981. It was finally criminalized in August 2007. It is estimated that up to 600,000 Mauritanians, or 20% of Mauritania's population, are currently in conditions which some consider to be "slavery", namely, many of them used as bonded labour due to poverty.

Slavery in the late 20th and 21st-century Muslim world

The issue of slavery in the Islamic world in modern times is controversial. Critics argue there is hard evidence of its existence and destructive effects. According to the Oxford Dictionary of Islam, slavery in central Islamic lands has been "virtually extinct" since the mid-20th century, though there are reports indicating that it is still practiced in some areas of Sudan and Somalia as a result of warfare.

Islamist opinions
Earlier in the 20th century, prior to the "reopening" of slavery by Salafi scholars like Shaykh al-Fawzan, Islamist authors declared slavery outdated without actually clearly supporting its abolition. This has caused at least one scholar, William Clarence-Smith, to bemoan the "dogged refusal of Mawlana Mawdudi to give up on slavery" and the notable "evasions and silences of Muhammad Qutb".

Muhammad Qutb, brother and promoter of the Egyptian author and revolutionary Sayyid Qutb, vigorously defended Islamic slavery from Western criticism, telling his audience that "Islam gave spiritual enfranchisement to slaves" and "in the early period of Islam the slave was exalted to such a noble state of humanity as was never before witnessed in any other part of the world." He contrasted the adultery, prostitution, and (what he called) "that most odious form of animalism" casual sex, found in Europe, with (what he called) "that clean and spiritual bond that ties a maid [i.e. slave girl] to her master in Islam."

Salafi support for slavery
In recent years, according to some scholars, there has been a "reopening" of the issue of slavery by some conservative Salafi Islamic scholars after its "closing" earlier in the 20th century when Muslim countries banned slavery.

In 2003, Shaykh Saleh Al-Fawzan, a member of Saudi Arabia's highest religious body, the Senior Council of Clerics, issued a fatwa claiming "Slavery is a part of Islam. Slavery is part of jihad, and jihad will remain as long there is Islam."
Muslim scholars who said otherwise were "infidels". In 2016, Shaykh al-Fawzan responded to a question about taking Yazidi women as sex slaves by reiterating that "Enslaving women in war is not prohibited in Islam", he added that those who forbid enslavement are either "ignorant or infidel".

While Saleh Al-Fawzan's fatwa does not repeal Saudi laws against slavery, the fatwa carries weight among many Salafi Muslims. According to reformist jurist and author Khaled Abou El Fadl, it "is particularly disturbing and dangerous because it effectively legitimates the trafficking in and sexual exploitation of so-called domestic workers in the Gulf region and especially Saudi Arabia." "Organized criminal gangs smuggle children into Saudi Arabia where they are enslaved, sometimes mutilated, and forced to work as beggars. When caught, the children are deported as illegal aliens."

Mauritania and Sudan
In Mauritania slavery was abolished in the country's first constitution of 1961 after independence, and abolished yet again, by presidential decree, in July 1980. The "catch" of these abolitions was that slave ownership was not abolished. The edict "recognized the rights of owners by stipulating that they should be compensated for their loss of property". No financial payment was provided by the state, so that the abolition amounted to "little more than propaganda for foreign consumption". Religious authorities within Mauritania assailed abolition. One leader, El Hassan Ould Benyamine, imam of a mosque in Tayarat attacked it as "not only illegal because it is contrary to the teachings of the fundamental text of Islamic law, the Koran. The abolition also amounts to the expropriation from Muslims of their goods, goods that were acquired legally. The state, if it is Islamic, does not have the right to seize my house, my wife or my slave.""God created Me to Be a Slave," New York Times Magazine, October 12, 1997, p. 58

In 1994–95, a Special Rapporteur of the United Nations Commission on Human Rights documented the physical and emotional abuse of captives by the Sudanese Army and allied militia and army. The captives were "sold as slaves or forced to work under conditions amounting to slavery". The Sudanese government responded with "fury", accusing the author, Gaspar Biro of "harboring anti-Islam and Anti-Arab sentiments". In 1999, the UN Commission sent another Special Rapporteur who "also produced a detailed examination of the question of slavery incriminating the government of Sudan." At least in the 1980s, slavery in Sudan was developed enough for slaves to have a market price the price of a slave boy fluctuating between $90 and $10 in 1987 and 1988.

Saudi Arabia

In 1962, Saudi Arabia abolished slavery officially; however, unofficial slavery is rumored to exist.

According to the U.S. State Department as of 2005:
Saudi Arabia is a destination for men and women from South and East Asia and East Africa trafficked for the purpose of labor exploitation, and for children from Yemen, Afghanistan, and Africa trafficking for forced begging. Hundreds of thousands of low-skilled workers from India, Indonesia, the Philippines, Sri Lanka, Bangladesh, Ethiopia, Eritrea, and Kenya migrate voluntarily to Saudi Arabia; some fall into conditions of involuntary servitude, suffering from physical and sexual abuse, non-payment or delayed payment of wages, the withholding of travel documents, restrictions on their freedom of movement and non-consensual contract alterations.

The Government of Saudi Arabia does not comply with the minimum standards for the elimination of trafficking and is not making significant efforts to do so.

Libya and Algeria
Libya is a major exit point for African migrants heading to Europe. International Organization for Migration (IOM) published a report in April 2017 showing that many of the migrants from Sub-Saharan Africa heading to Europe are sold as slaves after being detained by people smugglers or militia groups. African countries south of Libya were targeted for slave trading and transferred to Libyan slave markets instead. According to the victims, the price is higher for migrants with skills like painting and tiling. Slaves are often ransomed to their families and in the meantime until ransom can be paid tortured, forced to work, sometimes to death and eventually executed or left to starve if they can't pay for too long. Women are often raped and used as sex slaves and sold to brothels and private Libyan clients. Many child migrants also suffer from abuse and child rape in Libya.

In November 2017, hundreds of African migrants were being forced into slavery by human smugglers who were themselves facilitating their arrival in the country. Most of the migrants are from Nigeria, Senegal and Gambia. They however end up in cramped warehouses due to the crackdown by the Libyan Coast Guard, where they are held until they are ransomed or are sold for labor. Libyan authorities of the Government of National Accord announced that they had opened up an investigation into the auctions. A human trafficker told Al-Jazeera that hundreds of the migrants are bought and sold across the country every week. Dozens of African migrants headed for a new life in Europe in 2018 said they were sold for labor and trapped in slavery in Algeria.

Jihadists

Militants insurgencies have raged in recent times in the Muslim world in places like the Palestinian territories, Syria, Chechnya, Yemen, Kashmir and Somalia, and many of them have taken prisoners of war. Despite Taliban fighting in Afghanistan for decades, they have never sought to enslave their war captives (as of 2019). The Palestinian group Hamas has held Israeli prisoners (such as Gilad Shalit). Yet Hamas, which claims to uphold Islamic law, has also never sought to enslave its prisoners.

However, other jihadist groups have enslaved their captives, claiming sanction from Islam. In 2014, Islamic terrorist groups in the Middle East (ISIS also known as Islamic State) and Northern Nigeria (Boko Haram) have not only justified the taking of slaves in war but actually enslaved women and girls.
Abubakar Shekau, the leader of the Nigerian extremist group Boko Haram said in an interview, "I shall capture people and make them slaves". In the digital magazine Dabiq, ISIS claimed religious justification for enslaving Yazidi women. ISIS claimed that the Yazidi are idol worshipers and their enslavement part of the old shariah practice of spoils of war. The Economist reports that ISIS has taken "as many as 2,000 women and children" captive, selling and distributing them as sexual slaves. ISIS appealed to apocalyptic beliefs and "claimed justification by a Hadith that they interpret as portraying the revival of slavery as a precursor to the end of the world."

In response to Boko Haram's Quranic justification for kidnapping and enslaving people and ISIS's religious justification for enslaving Yazidi women, 126 Islamic scholars from around the Muslim world signed an open letter in late September 2014 to the Islamic State's leader Abu Bakr al-Baghdadi, rejecting his group's interpretations of the Qur'an and hadith to justify its actions. The letter accuses the group of instigating fitna sedition by instituting slavery under its rule in contravention of the anti-slavery consensus of the Islamic scholarly community.

Geography of the slave trade

"Supply" zones 
There is historical evidence of North African Muslim slave raids all along the Mediterranean coasts across Christian Europe. The majority of slaves traded across the Mediterranean region were predominantly of European origin from the 7th to 15th centuries. In the 15th century, Ethiopians sold slaves from western borderland areas (usually just outside the realm of the Emperor of Ethiopia) or Ennarea.

Barter 

Slaves were often bartered for objects of various kinds: in the Sudan, they were exchanged for cloth, trinkets and so on. In the Maghreb, slaves were swapped for horses. In the desert cities, lengths of cloth, pottery, Venetian glass slave beads, dyestuffs and jewels were used as payment. The trade in black slaves was part of a diverse commercial network. Alongside gold coins, cowrie shells from the Indian Ocean or the Atlantic (Canaries, Luanda) were used as money throughout sub-saharan Africa (merchandise was paid for with sacks of cowries).

Slave markets and fairs 

Enslaved Africans were sold in the towns of the Arab World. In 1416, al-Maqrizi told how pilgrims coming from Takrur (near the Senegal River) brought 1,700 slaves with them to Mecca. In North Africa, the main slave markets were in Morocco, Algiers, Tripoli and Cairo. Sales were held in public places or in souks.

Potential buyers made a careful examination of the "merchandise": they checked the state of health of a person who was often standing naked with wrists bound together. In Cairo, transactions involving eunuchs and concubines happened in private houses. Prices varied according to the slave's quality. Thomas Smee, the commander of the British research ship Ternate, visited such a market in Zanzibar in 1811 and gave a detailed description:

Africa: 8th through 19th centuries 
In April 1998, Elikia M'bokolo, wrote in Le Monde diplomatique. "The African continent was bled of its human resources via all possible routes. Across the Sahara, through the Red Sea, from the Indian Ocean ports and across the Atlantic. At least ten centuries of slavery for the benefit of the Muslim countries (from the ninth to the nineteenth)." He continues: "Four million slaves exported via the Red Sea, another four million through the Swahili ports of the Indian Ocean, perhaps as many as nine million along the trans-Saharan caravan route, and eleven to twenty million (depending on the author) across the Atlantic Ocean"

In the 8th century, Africa was dominated by Arab-Berbers in the north: Islam moved southwards along the Nile and along the desert trails.

 The Sahara was thinly populated. Nevertheless, since antiquity there had been cities living on a trade in salt, gold, slaves, cloth, and on agriculture enabled by irrigation: Tiaret, Oualata, Sijilmasa, Zaouila, and others.
 In the Middle Ages, the general Arabic term bilâd as-sûdân ("Land of the Blacks") was used for the vast Sudan region (an expression denoting West and Central Africa), or sometimes extending from the coast of West Africa to Western Sudan. It provided a pool of manual labour for North and Saharan Africa. This region was dominated by certain states and people: the Ghana Empire, the Empire of Mali, the Kanem-Bornu Empire, the Fulani and Hausa.
 In the Horn of Africa, the coasts of the Red Sea and Indian Ocean were controlled by local Somali and other Muslims, and Yemenis and Omanis had merchant posts along the coasts. The former Ethiopian coast, particularly the port of Massawa and Dahlak Archipelago, had long been a hub for the exportation of slaves from the interior by the Kingdom of Aksum and earlier polities. The slaves came from the southern regions of present-day Ethiopia. The port and most coastal areas were largely Muslim, and the port itself was home to a number of Arab and Indian merchants. The Solomonic dynasty of Ethiopia often exported Nilotic slaves from their western borderland provinces, or from newly conquered southern provinces. The Somali and Afar Muslim sultanates, such as the Adal Sultanate, also exported Nilotic slaves that they captured from the interior.
 In the African Great Lakes region, Omani and Yemeni traders set up slave-trading posts along the southeastern coast of the Indian Ocean; most notably in the archipelago of Zanzibar, along the coast of present-day Tanzania. The Zanj region or Swahili Coast flanking the Indian Ocean continued to be an important area for the Oriental slave trade up until the 19th century. Livingstone and Stanley were then the first Europeans to penetrate to the interior of the Congo Basin and to discover the scale of slavery there. The Arab Tippu Tip extended his influence there and captured many people as slaves. After Europeans had settled in the Gulf of Guinea, the trans-Saharan slave trade became less important. In Zanzibar, slavery was abolished late, in 1897, under Sultan Hamoud bin Mohammed.

Legacy 
The history of the slave trade has given rise to numerous debates amongst historians. For one thing, specialists are undecided on the number of Africans taken from their homes; this is difficult to resolve because of a lack of reliable statistics: there was no census system in medieval Africa. Archival material for the transatlantic trade in the 16th to 18th centuries may seem useful as a source, yet these record books were often falsified. Historians have to use imprecise narrative documents to make estimates which must be treated with caution: Luiz Felipe de Alencastro states that there were 8 million slaves taken from Africa between the 8th and 19th centuries along the Oriental and the Trans-Saharan routes.

Olivier Pétré-Grenouilleau has put forward a figure of 17 million African people enslaved (in the same period and from the same area) on the basis of Ralph Austen's work. Ronald Segal estimates between 11.5 and 14 million were enslaved by the Arab slave trade. Other estimates place it around 11.2 million.

There has also been a considerable genetic impact on Arabs throughout the Arab world from pre-modern African and European slaves.

Primary sources

Medieval Arabic sources 

These are given in chronological order. Scholars and geographers from the Arab world had been travelling to Africa since the time of Muhammad in the 7th century.

 Al-Masudi (died 957), Muruj adh-dhahab or The Meadows of Gold, the reference manual for geographers and historians of the Muslim world. The author had travelled widely across the Arab world as well as the Far East.
 Ya'qubi (9th century), Kitab al-Buldan or Book of Countries
 Abraham ben Jacob (Ibrahim ibn Jakub) (10th century), Jewish merchant from Córdoba
 Al-Bakri, author of Kitāb al-Masālik wa'l-Mamālik or Book of Roads and Kingdoms, published in Córdoba around 1068, gives us information about the Berbers and their activities; he collected eyewitness accounts on Saharan caravan routes.
 Muhammad al-Idrisi (died circa 1165), Description of Africa and Spain
 Ibn Battuta (died circa 1377), Moroccan geographer who travelled to sub-Saharan Africa, to Gao and to Timbuktu. His principal work is called A Gift to Those Who Contemplate the Wonders of Cities and the Marvels of Travelling.
 Ibn Khaldun (died in 1406), historian and philosopher from North Africa. Sometimes considered as the historian of Arab, Berber and Persian societies. He is the author of Muqaddimah or Historical Prolegomena and History of the Berbers.
 Al-Maqrizi (died in 1442), Egyptian historian. His main contribution is his description of Cairo markets.
 Leo Africanus (died circa 1548), author of Descrittione dell' Africa or Description of Africa, a rare description of Africa.
 Rifa'a al-Tahtawi (1801–1873), who translated medieval works on geography and history. His work is mostly about Muslim Egypt.
 Joseph Cuoq, Collection of Arabic sources concerning Western Africa between the 8th and 16th centuries (Paris 1975)

European texts (16th–19th centuries) 

 João de Castro, Roteiro de Lisboa a Goa (1538)
 James Bruce, (1730–1794), Travels to Discover the Source of the Nile (1790)
 René Caillié, (1799–1838), Journal d'un voyage à Tombouctou
 Robert Adams, The Narrative of Robert Adams (1816)
 Mungo Park, (1771–1806), Travels in the Interior of Africa (1816)
 Johann Ludwig Burckhardt, (1784–1817), Travels in Nubia (1819)
 Heinrich Barth, (1821–1865), Travels and Discoveries in North and Central Africa (1857)
 Richard Francis Burton, (1821–1890), The Lake Regions of Central Africa (1860)
 David Livingstone, (1813–1873), Travel diaries (1866–1873)
 Henry Morton Stanley, (1841–1904), Through the Dark Continent (1878)

Other sources 

 Historical manuscripts such as the Tarikh al-Sudan, the Adalite Futuh al-Habash, the Abyssinian Kebra Nagast, and various Arabic and Ajam documents
 African oral tradition
 Kilwa Chronicle (16th century fragments)
 Numismatics: analysis of coins and of their diffusion
 Archaeology: architecture of trading posts and of towns associated with the slave trade
 Iconography: Arab and Persian miniatures in major libraries
 European engravings, contemporary with the slave trade, and some more modern
 Photographs from the 19th century onward

See also

References

Citations

Sources

Further reading

In print

 Freamon, Bernard K.. Possessed by the Right Hand: The Problem of Slavery in Islamic Law and Muslim Cultures. Netherlands, Brill, 2019.
 Akande, Habeeb. Illuminating the Darkness: Blacks and North Africans in Islam (Ta Ha 2012)
 
 
 
 
  - First Edition 1991; Expanded Edition : 1992.
 
 
 
 
 
 
 
 
 Sikainga, Ahmad A. "Shari'a Courts and the Manumission of Female Slaves in the Sudan 1898–1939", The International Journal of African Historical Studies > Vol. 28, No. 1 (1995), pp. 1–24

Online
 Race and Slavery in the Middle East by Bernard Lewis
  Slavery in Islam (BBC (2009))

 
Islam-related controversies
History of slavery
Islam and government
History of Islam